Sara Mabel Gambetta (born 18 February 1993 in Lauterbach, Hesse) is a German shot putter and former heptathlete.

As a heptathlete, she won the silver medal at the 2010 World Junior Championships and at the 2011 European Junior Championships. She then switched to shot put, finishing eighth at the 2013 European U23 Championships and winning the bronze medal at the 2015 European U23 Championships. As a senior, she finished seventh at the 2016 European Championships.

She competed in women's shot put at the 2016 Summer Olympics where she finished 20th in qualification and did not advance.

Her personal best is 17.95 metres, achieved at the 2016 European Championships in Amsterdam. Her personal best in the heptathlon was 6108 points, achieved at the 2011 European Junior Championships in Tallinn.

She represents the club SC DHfK Leipzig.

References

1993 births
Living people
German female shot putters
German heptathletes
Athletes (track and field) at the 2016 Summer Olympics
Olympic athletes of Germany
People from Lauterbach, Hesse
Sportspeople from Giessen (region)
Athletes (track and field) at the 2020 Summer Olympics
20th-century German women
21st-century German women